Ketlin is an Estonian feminine given name. It's a variant of Katherine.

Notable people who share the given name Ketlin include:
Ketlin Priilinn (born 1982), Estonian writer
Ketlin Saar (born 1997), Estonian footballer
Ketlin Tekkel (born 1996), Estonian BMX rider

Estonian feminine given names